Scopula personata is a moth of the  family Geometridae. It is found in China, Taiwan, Korea, Japan and the Ryukyu Islands.

References

Moths described in 1913
personata
Moths of Asia